Márcio Garcia Machado (born 17 April 1970) is a Brazilian actor, television host, writer, producer and film director.

Biography
Márcio started his career at MTV, but in 1994 he moved to Rede Globo. He was a host of a children's show called "Gente Inocente" (Innocent People). From 1997 to 1999 he represented "Video Show", a show about television, artists and ecc. After 10 years at Globo TV, he went to Rede Record where he was a host of "O Melhor do Brasil" (The Best of Brasil).

His contract expired in 2008 and he decided not to renew it. Glória Perez invited him in her new telenovela named "Caminho das Indias", in which Marcio played his first part as a protagonist.

Márcio is married to Andrea Santa Rosa and they have three children: Pedro, Nina and Felipe.

Filmography

Novelas
 2013 – Amor à Vida .... Guto
 2009 – Caminho das Índias .... Bahuan Sundrani
 2006 – Vidas Opostas .... Jorge Alencar
 2005 – Prova de Amor .... Paulo Barão
 2003 – Celebridade .... Marcos Rangel
 1999 – Andando nas Nuvens .... Arnaldo San Marino
 1998 – Era Uma Vez .... motorista de táxi
 1997 – Anjo Mau .... Luís Carlos Machado
 1996 – Anjo de Mim .... Nando Monterrey
 1995 – Cara e Coroa .... Guiga
 1994 – Tropicaliente .... Cassiano

Television
 2005–2008 – O Melhor do Brasil .... host
 2006 – Avassaladoras - A Série  .... Caíque
 2005 – Mandrake – Ronaldo
 2003 – Sem Saida - TV Record
 2003 – Os Normais .... Nuno
 2002 – Os Normais .... Caio
 2002 -  Sítio do Picapau Amarelo .... Príncipe Rajá Codadade
 1999 – Você Decide
 1999 – Gente Inocente .... host
 1998 – Malhação .... Adriano
 1996 – Ponto a Ponto
 1995 – Você Decide

Film
 2016 - A Era do Gelo: O Big Bang .... Diego (Brazilian Dub)
 2012 - 31 Minutos, O Filme .... Túlio Triviño (Brazilian Dub)
 2012 - A Era do Gelo 4 .... Diego (Brazilian Dub)
 2012 – Open Road ....Director
 2010 – Bed & Breakfast ....Director
 2009 – A Era do Gelo 3 .... Diego (Brazilian dub)
 2008 – Carmo .... Diamantino dos Anjos
 2007 – The Ugly Duckling and Me! .... Feio – adult (Brazilian dub)
 2006 – A Era do Gelo 2 .... Diego (Brazilian dub)
 2006 – Back to Gaya .... Zino (Brazilian dub)
 2006 – Journey to the End of the Night .... owner of the club
 2005 – DragonBlade .... Lang (Brazilian dub)
 2003 – Xuxa Abracadabra .... Mateus
 2002 – A Era do Gelo .... Diego (Brazilian dub)
 1999 – Zoando na TV .... Ulisses
 1996 – O Guarani .... Peri
 1999 - Ice

External links

1970 births
Living people
Male actors from Rio de Janeiro (city)
Brazilian male television actors
Brazilian male telenovela actors
Brazilian male film actors